Adim may refer to:

 Adim Williams, a Nigerian film director
 Ma'adim Vallis, an outflow channel on Mars
 Ibn al-Adim, a biographer and historian from Aleppo
 A diminished chord, a type of musical triad with root A